Theodore Christopher Marceau (May 28, 1859 – June 22, 1922) was an American photographer. He pioneered the creation of a national chain of photographic studios in the United States in the 1880s. He founded the Marceau Studios in Manhattan, Philadelphia and Boston and was one of the most widely known photographers in the country.

Biography

Marceau's career as a photographer began when he was 22, serving as the official photographer of the United States government astronomical expedition to South America to observe the transit of Venus. He then served on the staff of the Governor of Ohio, and the Governor of California.

In time Marceau had diversified photographic studios that did portraiture, scientific photography, and occasional photojournalism. Upon his marriage to Amanda Fiske in 1891, Marceau became greatly interested in theatrical portraiture. He made extensive use of props, drapes, and painted backdrops in his portraits. Well connected to the political establishment, Marceau also specialized in official portraiture, travel images, and advertising photography. His various branches were run as local service photography shops, doing home photography, Society shots, and official function images.

In 1897 Marceau purchased his Premium Point estate in New Rochelle, where he had since lived. In 1900, he decided to transfer his base of operations to New York City. He established "Marceau Studios" and installed Edgar A. Caffey as his photographer and operator. The death of Napoleon Sarony in 1896 had left a vacuum in the city. Jonathan Burrow had already purchased the Sarony studio, but Marceau reasoned that if he could purchase the name rights of Napoleon's son, Otto Sarony, he could co-opt the biggest name in celebrity photography. He succeeded and for much of the first decade of the 20th century Marceau ran the major New York studio "Otto Sarony" as well.

Marceau quickly became a fixture in the associational world of the photography profession in New York. In 1905 he organized the Professional Photographers Society of New York State and served as its first vice-president. He also organized the "Copyright League" that lobbied the United States Congress for stronger rights protections for photographers against the appropriation of their images by newspapers. It is Marceau who recommended that a "c" with a circle around it and the photographer's name on the front of an image serve as the public claim that an image was copyright protected.

Investments and societies
Marceau who took the proceeds from his studio at 285 Fifth Avenue and sunk them into real estate and collecting. He owned substantial chunks of Manhattan real estate, a fleet of automobiles, and was the financial sponsor of the Rotary Motor Company. He was listed in the New York Blue Book and was worth millions at the time of his death.

He was a member of the Masonic Fraternity, the Democratic Club of New York, the New York Athletic Club, and the New Rochelle and Larchmont Yacht Clubs and the Wykagyl Country Club, of New Rochelle.

Death
He died due to heart failure at his home in Premium Point, New Rochelle on June 22, 1922. He was survived by one son, Theodore Marceau Jr. who briefly took over operation of the studio before selling the brand.

References

External links

New York Public Library – Theodore C. Marceau Image Gallery
Corbis Images – Theodore C. Marceau

Artists from New Rochelle, New York
1859 births
1922 deaths
Photographers from New York City
People from Boston
Photographers from Philadelphia